Hoh Fuk Tong Centre is located at 28 Castle Peak Road - San Hui, San Hui, Tuen Mun, New Territories, Hong Kong near Light Rail Hoh Fuk Tong stop. Morrison Building is a declared monument of Hong Kong. 

History
Hoh Fuk Tong Centre was built by General Cai Tingkai (1892–1968), who led the Nineteenth Corps against the Japanese invasion between 1936 and the early 1940s. 

The centre was the villa of General Cai from 1936 to 1946.
After the closure of Ta Teh Institute, the London Missionary Society, now the Council for World Mission, bought the campus and lent it to the Church of Christ in China since 1950. 

The London Missionary Society formally transferred the ownership of the compound to the Church at a token fee of one dollar in 1961.

In early 2000s, the Hong Kong Council of the Church of Christ in China applied to the Buildings Department to demolish all the centre's historical buildings and redevelop the site. 

But San School and Hoh Fuk Tong College would also have been torn down.

To protect the historic building from demolition, Morrison House was declared a proposed monument on 11 April 2003; it was later declared as monument on 26 March 2004.

Buildings
The Morrison Building and the Hoh Fuk Tong Centrr Building are two of the oldest buildings in the centre.

Morrison Building
Constructed in 1936, Morrison Building was the oldest building in the Hoh Fuk Tong Centre; it was the main building of the Former Dade Institute.

Hoh Fuk Tong Centre Building
Hoh Fuk Tong Centre Building was constructed in the 1940s; it had been used as the girls' dormitory of the Former Dade Institute. It was also known as the "Red House" as it was built of red bricks.

References

External links
 Map of Hoh Fuk Tong Centre 福堂樓
 Ta Teh Institute, Hulu Culture

Declared monuments of Hong Kong
Tuen Mun
Buildings and structures in Hong Kong